DREAM.5 Light Weight Grandprix 2008 Final Round was a mixed martial arts event promoted by Fighting and Entertainment Group's mixed martial arts promotion DREAM. The event took place on Monday July 21, 2008 at the Osaka-jo Hall in Osaka, Japan and hosted the final round of the promotion's Lightweight tournament. 

The DREAM.5 attracted a crowd of 11,986 to the Osaka Jo Hall and was broadcast live in Japan on the TBS network and SkyPerfect and on HDNet Fights in the United States.

Results

* Hansen replaced Alvarez due to a cut received in his fight with Kawajiri.

2008 Lightweight Grand Prix bracket

** Replacement.

Dream Lightweight Grand Prix Reserve Bouts:
 Joachim Hansen def.  Kultar Gill at DREAM.5

Notes
 The 8th matchup was initially to be postponed until DREAM.2 due to the injuries of Vítor Ribeiro and Caol Uno along with Gilbert Melendez's prior commitment to Strikeforce. Dream officials decided to directly seed Caol Uno into the 2nd round against Mitsuhiro Ishida as the 8th fighter.
 Nick Diaz was originally scheduled to fight Hayato Sakurai to determine the Dream Welterweight Champion, but Diaz had to pull out due to contractual obligations to EliteXC.
 Mirko "Crocop" Filipovic had been a long rumored participant. Originally scheduled to face Jerome LeBanner, and later Mighty Mo Siligia, Mirko had to pull out due to  a recovering shoulder injury and minor impending knee surgery. Mirko expressed interest in fighting at DREAM.6 in September.
 Denis Kang had been another long rumored participant. With one fight left on his FEG contract, Denis Kang would have become an unrestricted free agent at the conclusion of this bout. However, he was pulled from the card late in July for unknown reasons.
After his bout with Mirko "Crocop" Filipovic was scrapped, Jérôme Le Banner was scheduled to fight Mark Hunt. However, LeBanner had to pull out late due to injury.
 Appearing on the original DREAM.5 banner, Minowaman was pulled from the card to instead fight at Deep: Gladiators.
 The bout between Norifumi "KID" Yamamoto and  Joseph Benavidez has been canceled due to a knee injury Yamamoto suffered in training. Yamamoto has been replaced by Junya Kodo.
 Reports indicate Dream.5 scored a 10.0 rating for network TV on the TBS broadcast in Japan. The rating peaked at 13.9 during the Akiyama-Shibata fight.

See also 
 Dream (mixed martial arts)
 List of Dream champions
 2008 in DREAM

References

External links
Dream 5 official card

Dream (mixed martial arts) events
2008 in mixed martial arts
Mixed martial arts in Japan
Sport in Osaka
2008 in Japan